The FIS Nordic Junior and U23 World Ski Championships 2006 took place in Kranj, Slovenia from 30 January to 5 February 2006. It was the 29th Junior World Championships. This was the first time that the Under-23 World Championships and the Junior World Champions were held at the same time and location.

This was the first championship where women competed in ski jumping. Juliane Seyfarth of Germany became the first female junior world champion by winning the normal hill event on 2 February 2006.

Medal summary

Junior events

Cross-country skiing

Nordic Combined

Ski jumping

Under-23 events

Cross-country skiing

Medal tables

All events

Junior events

Under-23 events

References 

2006
2006 in cross-country skiing
2006 in ski jumping
Junior World Ski Championships
2006 in youth sport
International sports competitions hosted by Slovenia